Isaac Samuels Pennybacker (September 3, 1805 – January 12, 1847) was a United States representative and a United States senator from Virginia and a United States district judge of the United States District Court for the Western District of Virginia.

Education and career

Born on September 3, 1805, at Pine Forge near Newmarket, Shenandoah County, Virginia, Pennybacker attended an "old field" school and the Winchester Law School. He was admitted to the bar and entered private practice in Harrisonburg, Rockingham County, Virginia until 1837.

House service

Pennybacker was elected as a Democrat from Virginia's 16th congressional district to the United States House of Representatives of the 25th United States Congress, serving from March 4, 1837, to March 3, 1839. He declined the office of United States Attorney General offered him by President Martin Van Buren and that of Justice of the Supreme Court of Virginia.

Federal judicial service

Pennybacker received a recess appointment from President Martin Van Buren on April 23, 1839, to a seat on the United States District Court for the Western District of Virginia vacated by Judge Alexander Caldwell. He was nominated to the same position by President Van Buren on January 23, 1840. He was confirmed by the United States Senate on February 17, 1840, and received his commission the same day. His service terminated on December 6, 1845, due to his resignation.

Senate service and death

Pennybacker was elected as a Democrat to the United States Senate to fill the vacancy in the term beginning March 4, 1845, caused by the failure of the Virginia General Assembly to elect, and served from December 3, 1845, until his death. He was Chairman of the Committee on Claims for the 29th United States Congress. He died on January 12, 1847, in Washington, D.C. He was interred in Woodbine Cemetery in Harrisonburg.

Other service

President James K. Polk named Pennybacker to the very first Board of Regents of the Smithsonian Institution, a group which included Vice-President George M. Dallas, Chief Justice Roger B. Taney, Washington, D.C. Mayor William Winston Seaton, Senator Sidney Breese, United States Representative William Jervis Hough, United States Representative Robert Dale Owen, United States Representative Henry Washington Hilliard, Rufus Choate, Richard Rush, Dr. Benjamin Rush, William C. Preston, Alexander Dallas Bache, and Joseph Gilbert Totten, among others, who met for the first time in September 1846.

Family

Pennybacker was a cousin of Green Berry Samuels, a United States representative from Virginia.

See also
 List of United States Congress members who died in office (1790–1899)

References

Sources
 
 
 Hon. Armistead M. Dobie, "Federal District Judges in Virginia before the Civil War," 12 F.R.D. 451 (1951,1952) (viewed on Westlaw)

1805 births
1847 deaths
Virginia lawyers
Judges of the United States District Court for the Western District of Virginia
United States federal judges appointed by Martin Van Buren
19th-century American judges
Democratic Party United States senators from Virginia
People from New Market, Virginia
Democratic Party members of the United States House of Representatives from Virginia
19th-century American politicians
19th-century American lawyers
Winchester Law School alumni